Galeodumus is a monotypic genus of Galeodid camel spiders, first described by Carl Friedrich Roewer in 1960. Its single species, Galeodumus colognatoi is distributed in Afghanistan.

References 

Solifugae
Arachnid genera
Monotypic arachnid genera